Jamie Morgan (born 8 June 1971) is a former professional tennis player from Australia.  Morgan never won an ATP level singles title, but finished runner-up three times.  He reached the fourth round of the 1993 U.S. Open, his best performance at a Grand Slam event.  He achieved a career-high singles ranking of world No. 52 in 1993.

He played two singles matches for the Australian Davis Cup team in their 1994 World Group first round tie against Russia.

Jamie attended Sydney Boys High School, graduating in 1986 before winning a tennis scholarship at the Australian Institute of Sport in 1986.

Career finals

Singles titles (1)

Singles runners-up (8)

References

External links
 
 
 

Australian male tennis players
Sportsmen from New South Wales
Living people
1971 births
People educated at Sydney Boys High School
Tennis players from Sydney